The 1950 Ohio State Buckeyes football team represented Ohio State University in the 1950 Big Nine Conference football season. The Buckeyes compiled a 6–3 record. The season finale against Michigan was the infamous game later known as the Snow Bowl as the teams combined for 45 punts in wintry weather.  Ohio State outscored their opponents, 286–111, on the season, but head coach Wes Fesler's record against Michigan fell to 0–3–1.

Schedule

Coaching staff
 Wes Fesler, head coach, fourth year

Awards and honors
 Vic Janowicz, Heisman Trophy

1951 NFL draftees

References

Ohio State
Ohio State Buckeyes football seasons
Ohio State Buckeyes football